Elections in Nigeria are forms of choosing representatives to the Federal Government of Nigeria and the various states in the fourth republic Nigeria. Elections in Nigeria started since 1959 with different political parties. It's a method of choosing leaders where the citizens have right to vote and to be voted for. For 2023, Nigerians are getting ready for Presidential elections with about 93.4 million eligible voters across the federation for the 25 February election.

Background
Nigerians elects on the federal level a head of state (the President of Nigeria)  and a legislature (the National Assembly). The president is elected by the people. The National Assembly has two chambers. The House of Representatives has 360 members, elected for a four-year term in single-seat constituencies. The Senate has 109 members, elected for a four-year term: each of the 36 states are divided into 3 senatorial districts, each of which is represented by one senator; the Federal Capital Territory is represented by only one senator.

Nigeria has a multi-party system, with two or three strong parties and a third party that is electorally successful. However, members of the People's Democratic Party (PDP) had controlled the presidency since elections were resumed in 1999 until 2015 when Muhammadu Buhari won the presidential election.

1999 elections 

Presidential elections were held in Nigeria on 27 February 1999. These were the first elections since the 1993 military coup, and the first elections of the Fourth Nigerian Republic.

2003 elections 

Presidential elections were held in Nigeria on 19 April 2003.

2007 elections

The Nigerian general elections of 2007 were held on 14 April and 21 April 2007. Governorship and state assembly elections were held on 14 April, while the presidential and national assembly elections were held a week later on 21 April. late Umaru Yar'Adua won the highly controversial election for the ruling People's Democratic Party (PDP) and was sworn in on 29 May.

The ruling PDP won 26 of the 32 states, according to Independent National Electoral Commission (INEC), including Kaduna State and Katsina State, where the results were contested by the local population.

Following the presidential election, groups monitoring the election gave it a dismal assessment.
Chief European Union observer Max van den Berg reported that the handling of the polls had "fallen far short" of basic international standards, and that "the process cannot be considered to be credible."  A spokesman for the United States Department of State said it was "deeply troubled" by election polls, calling them "flawed", and said it hoped the political parties would resolve any differences over the election through peaceful, constitutional means.

2011 elections

A parliamentary election was held in Nigeria on 9 April 2011. The election was originally scheduled to be held on 2 April, but was later postponed to 4 April.

A presidential election was held in Nigeria on 16 April 2011, postponed from 9 April 2011. The election follows controversy as to whether a Muslim or Christian should be allowed to become president given the tradition of rotating the top office between the religions and following the death of Umaru Yar'Adua, who was a Muslim, and Goodluck Jonathan, a Christian, assuming the interim presidency.

Following the election widespread violence took place in the northern parts of the country. Goodluck Jonathan was declared the winner on 19 April. The elections was reported in the international media as having run smoothly with relatively little violence or voter fraud in contrast to previous elections, in particular the widely disputed 2007 election. The United States State Department said the election was "successful" and a "substantial improvement" over 2007, although it added that vote rigging and fraud also took place.

2015 elections

The 2015 general elections was originally scheduled to hold 14 February, but was later postponed to 28 March{Presidential, Senatorial and House of Representatives} and 11 April 2015 {Governorship and state house of Assembly}.  General Muhammadu Buhari of the All Progressives Congress emerged as the winner of the Presidential elections and was sworn in on 29 May 2015. The 2015 Election was a success because there were tensions everywhere concerning the difficult politics and the security environment of the country at that time. However, It was the first time in the history of Nigeria that an incumbent president lost an election. Goodluck Ebele Johnathan of the People's Democratic Party lost his seat to Muhammadu Buhari of the All Progressives Congress .

2019 elections

Presidential and  National Assembly Elections were scheduled for 16 February 2019, while State and Local government elections were scheduled for 2 March 2019. Elections were postponed by one week after INEC cited logistic challenges. The rescheduled dates are 23 February and 9 March 2019.

President Muhammadu Buhari was re-elected for another four-year term. The primary contender was former vice president, Atiku Abubakar of the People's Democratic Party (PDP).
Kingsley Moghalu of the Young Progressives Party (YPP), Yele Sowore of the African Action Congress (AAC) and Fela Durotoye of the Alliance for a New Nigeria (ANN) were other popular candidates who are all relatively young. Late in 2018, these three parties alongside some others attempted to form a coalition. However, the candidates pulled out of the coalition and decided to continue running on their respective platforms. There are 73 candidates contesting in the presidential election.

The 2019 governorship and state house of assembly election was earlier scheduled for 2 March 2019 was rescheduled for Saturday 9, March 2019. With two major political parties; All Progressives Congress (APC) and People's Democratic Party fielding candidates in the elections across various states except Rivers where a court order prohibits The All Progressives Congress from fielding candidates as a result of internal crisis with the state chapter of the party. 

In Nigeria, the  2019  General  Election came up with its own  unique issues, challenges and successes that have not been witnessed in the previous five elections in Nigeria’s Fourth Republic.

2023 elections 

General elections were held in Nigeria on 25 February 2023 to elect the President and Vice President and members of the Senate and House of Representatives.

See also
 Electoral calendar
 Electoral system
 Open ballot system

References

External links

African Elections Database
Adam Carr's Election Archive